WXSU-LP is the student-run radio station at Salisbury University in Salisbury, Maryland. The station, formerly known as WSUR, was forced to change call letters when registering with the FCC because of an existing television station with those call letters in Puerto Rico.  WXSU-LP first went live to the Salisbury community in 2005 with a low power, 100 watt signal. The station currently operates during the Fall and Spring semesters from Late August to Mid-May.

WXSU-LP is considered a "Big 6 Student Organization" at Salisbury University because it is one of the six top student organizations that receives block funding from the university. The station can be picked up around the Salisbury area and the studio is located in the Guerrieri University Center. The station is also available on the campus cable system in partnership with SUTV on channel 7-6 and 8-1. WXSU-LP broadcasts online streaming as of August 2013 on UStream. WXSU-LP works closely with the campus community and Registered Student Organizations (RSO's) to provide DJ services and promotions for meaningful events. WXSU-LP is celebrating 40 years as a student-run radio organization from its beginning as WSSC in 1974. The first broadcast date of WSSC was November 6, 1974 and the first song to be played was "Enter the Young" by the Association.

History

WSSC was founded as a student-run radio station in 1974 when students felt that the campus of then Salisbury State College, was missing something. The founding members include Mike Seidel, Gary Rosser, Rick Holloway, Steve Shriver and Dan Gladding.  The station was located in the basement of Manokin, a residence hall on the north side of campus.  The station originally broadcast on a carrier current AM channel and was known as WSSC 530AM. As the station and SSC began to grow, WSSC was moved to its next location in the gymnasium—Tawes Gym.  Tawes was located where the relatively new Fulton Hall stands today.  The station began broadcasting on the college's cable network on Channel 11, where it remained until the summer of 2002, when it moved to Channel 44. The carrier current broadcast was dropped for an improved sound on a stereo cable frequency, 107.5 FM, and was broadcast both on campus, and throughout all of Salisbury via the local cable company until summer of 2002.  In 1991, WSUR (renamed after SSC became Salisbury State University in 1989) moved to its current location in the Guerrieri University Center.  In the fall of 1999, WSUR took an early jump into the 21st century and began a live audiostream that is sent all over the world first using Shoutcast, and later changing to a Windows Media Player and Real Player stream. In September 2020 WXSU installed a system called D.A.D. and now the station runs off that automated program and scheduler.

References

External links
 
 

XSU-LP
Salisbury University
Radio stations established in 2005
XSU-LP
XSU-LP
2005 establishments in Maryland